Histaminergic means "working on the histamine system", and histaminic means "related to histamine".

A histaminergic agent (or drug) is a chemical which functions to directly modulate the histamine system in the body or brain. Examples include histamine receptor agonists and histamine receptor antagonists (or antihistamines). Subdivisions of histamine antagonists include H1 receptor antagonists, H2 receptor antagonists, and H3 receptor antagonists.

See also
 Adenosinergic
 Adrenergic
 Cannabinoidergic
 Cholinergic
 Dopaminergic
 GABAergic
 Glycinergic
 Melatonergic
 Monoaminergic
 Opioidergic
 Serotonergic

References

Neurochemistry
Neurotransmitters